Friedrich Akel's cabinet was in office in Estonia from 26 March 1924 to 16 December 1924, when it was succeeded by Jüri Jaakson's cabinet.

Members

This cabinet's members were the following:

References

Cabinets of Estonia